Winkabar Shin Tan is a Burmese action-crime television series. It aired on MRTV-4, from April 19, to May 17, 2019, on Mondays to Fridays at 20:45 for 21 episodes.

Cast
Nat Khat as Sheriff Nay Thurain
Nan Sandar Hla Htun as Honey
Sithu Win as Tain Yan Htun
La Pyae as Zaw Naing
Shwe Sin Wint Shein as Htet Htet
Ju Jue Pan Htwar as Aye Aye Khine
Thar Htet Nyan Zaw as Wanna
Kyaw Htet as Nay Chi
Pyay Zin as U Thet Naing Aung
Khun Nay Chi Cho as Myat Lay Nwe
Shwe Eain Min as Zin Cho

References

Burmese television series
MRTV (TV network) original programming